is a 2001 role-playing video game developed by Brownie Brown and published by Nintendo for the Game Boy Advance only in Japan on December 7, 2001, and was later re-released in the same region in 2006. Japanese singer, model, and actress Mika Nakashima was featured in the television commercials for Magical Vacation. The game received a full English language fan translation in 2016. 

A sequel was produced for the Nintendo DS in 2006, titled Magical Vacation: Itsutsu no Hoshi ga Narabu Toki. It was released in North America and Europe as Magical Starsign.

Gameplay
The game is a standard RPG adventure game, where the player interacts with the overworld to progress the story while battling against enemies in a turn-based battle system. There are 16 different elements in the game, each of which is stronger than another specific element, and weaker against another. Exceptions to this rule are: the love element (not stronger or weaker than any of the other elements), the dark element (stronger than all other elements except for love and light), and the light element (no weakness).

Spirit combos
The player can increase the power of attacks by borrowing power from elemental spirits in a process called . To use a spirit combo, the player must summon an elemental spirit, and use magic of the same element in the following turns to release vast amounts of damage. Attack power is doubled per spirit present, meaning 2 spirits would create 4 times as much damage, and 3 spirits would create 8 times as much. The maximum combo (7 spirits) yields 128 times as much damage. The power of basic magic can surpass that of advanced magic if the player uses this combo. However, certain special rules apply to its use. For instance, the enemy can summon spirits of a stronger element to eliminate the combo's effectiveness (having one fire elemental spirit will eliminate the effect of one wind elemental spirit), and spirits can be extracted from the field using certain spells. The combo also applies for bombs which contain the magic power of an element. The maximum number of spirits that can be summoned is 7 (regardless of how many spirits were present at the start of the battle), and spirits must be re-summoned per combo use.

Amigo system

This system allows the player to interact with the Game Boy Advance's multiplayer link. The first option, allows players to exchange main characters to acquire new spells. For instance, exchanging between a wind elemental main character and a sound elemental one will allow the wind elemental character to learn a sound elemental spell, and vice versa. Magic learned in this way can be strengthened with experience like all other spells from the beginning of the game. Each player can also receive "special" spell data, which can be equipped to allied characters. However, equipped spells will not strengthen with experience. Exchanging a certain number of times will give the main character a new spell or change their element. Love magic is acquired if the player exchanges with 5 players of the same element. Exchanging 100 times will change the main character's element to the dark element and change their appearance to the dark costume. Learning all of the spells in the game and fulfilling the two prior requirements will give the main character light magic, change their element to the light element, and change them into the light costume.

The second option,  becomes available if the player has gone to the hot spring in the Plain of Light at least once during the game. Using the other player's hot spring will increase the main character's powers (different types of hot springs improve different status points; using the same hot spring repeatedly decreases the probability of powering up). After a certain number of uses, the player may be offered a choice to upgrade their hot spring. The level of upgrade is dependent on the player's rank of gameplay.

The third option, is the multiplayer battle mode. A multiplayer battle is conducted in the same way as regular battles in the story mode, but winning a certain number of battles or maintaining a certain winning percentage awards the main character a special title that boosts their abilities. 3 elemental spirits (chosen randomly) also appear at the beginning of every multiplayer turn.

Nintendo organized two events in 2002 to gather Magical Vacation players together to make the Amigo system more accessible. The first event was held on January 26 in Osaka, and the second event was held the following day on January 27 in Tokyo. These events allowed players who only had access to one game cartridge to quickly gain power-ups for their characters.

Setting

Plot
Once upon a time, war erupted for three days in the magic kingdom Kovomaka. This war was kept a secret from ordinary citizens, but one man began to travel all around the country in preparation for the next battle, and several years later, the game's main character enters the magic school Will-O-Wisp at the invitation of the school's principal. The main character possessed the ability to see and interact with spirits since youth, and was ostracized because of this ability.

The students of the Will-O-Wisp school are sent away to a summer school by the Valencia seaside despite warnings that several students from other schools had gone missing on the beach in the past. One afternoon, a strange monster called an Enigma appears on the beach, abducting some of the students. The hero must find the missing students and uncover the mysteries of the Enigma and war that occurred in the kingdom.

World map
The game map is divided into four "plains" (planes) which can be traversed using a magic bus that warps into different plains. The first plain is the player's original world, which houses the Will-O-Wisp school and Valencia seaside. The second is the Plain of Light, where puppets, angels, and dwarves live. The Palace of Light and other ruins are located at the center area, along with a hot springs. The third plain is the Plain of Darkness, where all sorts of habitats, including a forest, iceberg, desert, and volcano, are located in close proximity. The Vox and Nyamnelt species make their homes in this plain, and many Enigma monsters live in the Forest of Enigmas. The entrance to the secret dungeon is also located within this plain. The final plain is the Plane of Death, which provides a stark contrast to the other environments with its darkened sky and charred ground. Even so, several species live in this plain, and the deepest area contains the cave of resurrection. A fifth plain called the Plain of Water is also mentioned, but does not appear in the game itself.

Characters

Will-O-Wisp classmates
Hero/Heroine (Human, age 14)
The player's character has no default name, and the player may choose the character's gender and element as well. The character cannot start out with the light, dark, or love elements, but can learn spells of other elements or change elements using the Amigo system. The main character's appearance changes when they acquire the light or dark elements.

Kirsche prefers sports over academics, though he excels at neither. He has been friends with Arancia since childhood, and never seems to give up even if he loses. He is infatuated with Candy Mintblue, and his magic make Gummi Worms appear in MP recovery jars.

Arancia is a gifted musician who can play a multitude of musical instruments, including the piano, harp, strings, percussion, and woodwinds. Her natural talent comes from her musical family, and she can master any instrument almost instantly. However, her music seems to lack emotion and expression, and often causes listeners to lose interest and doze off. She is less than thrilled about Kirsche's affection for Candy Mintblue. Her magic allows the player to discover gold or silver coins from chests.

Ganache is a cool and withdrawn student who was born into a family that bears the dark element. He believes that he and his sister, Vanilla, are different from others, and begins to pursue the Enigma after his sister's disappearance three years ago (he explains that his intention was to merge with the Enigma in order to save his sister). He prefers to be alone, and only associates with users of dark magic and the people from the Benakoncha ruins. His hobby is playing the harmonic near the river, and his dark magic makes him a powerful character in battle. His feelings towards Candy Mintblue begin to shift as the story progresses.

Cassis is a nihilistic boy who seems to have underground connections. He lost his father at a young age, but is unaware of the cause of his death. His hobby is collecting knives, and he is a proficient cook. He continuously courts his classmate, Blueberry Lakeside, but is rejected every time. His magic allows the player to retain Gummi Frogs even when a blade spirit joins.

Cider is an artist and art critic whose precocious talent allowed him to open his own exhibition at age 10. However, he has recently lacked a theme that he can be passionate enough to depict. He acts as a tutor to his cousin, Souffle, and his magic prevents birds from blocking the player's path. As the story progresses, it is revealed that his mother has a dark past.

Blueberry is a calm and collected girl who comes from an aristocratic family in the service of the king. She is a tremendously hard worker, and is continuously at the top of her class as a result, but her frail body prevents her from strenuous activities. She is best friends with Lemon Airsupply, who saved her from bullies during childhood. She seems unsure how to react to Cassis Lumberyard's affection.

Lemon is an active, boyish girl who hails from a family of martial artists, but an accident during childhood prevents her from joining the rest of the family, causing her to enter the Will-O-Wisp magic school. She cannot bear to watch bullying, and is fond of Blueberry Lakeside.

Olive is a shy, gentle girl who likes animals. She had the ability to read minds from youth, but a certain event caused her to fear looking into people's minds. She thinks of Ganache Nighthawk as a brother, and her ability to read minds allows her to understand him better than the other students.

Cabernet is a mischievous and pessimistic boy who was taught magic by a frog. The frog lives in Cabernet's head, and prevents him from picking up Gummi Frogs. His magic makes Gummi Frogs run away, but also allows the player to reach paths blocks by the Gummis. He used to bully Blueberry Lakeside, but stopped after being reprimanded by Lemon Airsupply. He has knowledge of the hidden past between his older brother, Chardonnay, and Ganache's sister, Vanilla.

Pistachio is a kind but cowardly boy who is one of the least skilled magic users in the Will-O-Wisp school. His grades are terrible, and he is bordering on failing. He wears a pair of pants on his head instead of a hat, and likes to read manga.

Peche is a very diligent girl who loves to look after others. Her personality fits the mold of class president.

Sesame loves bugs, and houses a number of them in his house as pets. He always keeps bugs in his pocket, and is rather introverted and timid. He looks up to Kirsche Pintail, and likes to follow him around.

Café au Lait is a robot that the Will-O-Wisp school principal bought for only 200 Bira at an antique store (roughly equivalent to the price of basic armor available at the beginning of the game). His machinery is quite rare and valuable, but he is disassembled and operated on several times throughout the course of the game. Café au Lait's personality is designed to be cool and nihilistic, and a character very similar to Café au Lait makes an appearance in the game's sequel as well.

Chocolat was buried in the ground near the school for a long time before being dug up one day by the students. He talks like a small child, and likes to play with small animals. His magic allows the player to find Gummi Worms hidden underneath rocks.

Candy is a talkative, active girl who is attracted to Ganache Nighthawk. Her affection for Ganache plays a strong role in her actions during the later parts of the game. Though she exhibits a carefree personality, she actually despises herself for lacking courage. She rivals Blueberry Lakeside in school smarts, and her hobby is collecting handkerchiefs. She is utterly oblivious of Kirsche Pintail's infatuation with her. Her magic allows the player to remove bomb pots without using a Gummi Frog.

Other important characters from the Will-O-Wisp magic school include the main character's teacher, who seems to be an ordinary teacher but is actually a very powerful magician. She is held captive in Chiboust Castle.  is Cabernet's older brother, who was a soldier in the Kovomaka army. He died while searching for Vanilla a year before the start of the story.

Species
Vox
These dog-like creatures are faithful to their village leader, and live according to strict rules and practices.

Nyamnelt
These cat-like creatures are brave and resourceful, having survived in the harsh environment of the Plain of Darkness. They can provide useful information concerning other species.

Puppet
This species bears resemblance to dolls. Some puppets age, while others do not. Cabernet is one of the puppets that does age.

Love Ambassador
This species is highly sensitive to anything concerning love. Females of this species are beautiful, but all of the males are ugly.

Mudman
Mudmen are made of earth and mud. Their bodies are very tough, but they melt at high temperatures. They are said to have jewels hidden within their bodies.

Pots
These creatures are located all around the map. The most prevalent are the rain pots, which regain health. Another type disintegrates when a Gummi Frog is placed inside, and others may give the player some tips.

Java Sparrows
These birds are present in many parts of the game. The black Java Sparrow in the Plain of Darkness cannot be moved, even if a lever is employed, so the player must seek help from one of the classmates in order to get beyond it.

Dodo
These are creatures turned into Dodo form by the Enigma's curse. It takes 1000 years for them to return to their original forms, though there is a special way for spirits to break the curse. Dodo blood is famous for its curing properties, which causes them to be hunted quite often.

Konnyaku-sama
These creatures are konnyaku that can speak and move. They are in danger of becoming extinct, and the remaining ones travel around the world in search for konnyakuimo, which can increase their numbers.

Water people
These are creatures made up of water, which mostly live in the Plain of Darkness. They communicate in their own unique language, and the assistance of one of the player's classmates is needed to communicate with them.

Piranha
These creatures appear in many of the dungeons, and demand money when the player comes into contact with them. Refusing to pay increases the amount of money that they demand, but having one particular classmate on the team will void their demands. The player does not have to pay if the amount of money they demand is more than the player currently has. Their actions begin to change if the player pays them more than a certain amount of money.

Ancient Robot
These are robots from over 12000 years ago, and can be found near the Penakoncha Ruins. Their speech is displayed in a unique katakana font.

Star
Magicians that die in places other than the Plain of Death becomes Stars. They are resurrected after passing through the corridor of death in Rakyuo, and may retain some of their past memories.

Gummi Frogs
There are three types of Gummi Frogs (red, blue, and green), and they can be used as items to restore health. However, they cannot be caught while the player is traveling with certain characters, and certain spirits will not join if the player catches too many of them.

Gummi Worms
There are two types of Gummi Worms (red and yellow), and they can be used as items to restore magic power. However, they tend to run away into the ground when the player approaches, and going after them causes an enemy to appear. Traveling with a certain character allows the player to catch the worms without fighting an enemy.

Dwarves
These bearded creatures are superb craftsmen. They are familiar with the mechanics of Ancient Robots, and will sometimes create robots themselves. The dwarf capital is the Guide Monga mountain in the Plain of Light, but lower-class creatures are prevented from entering the mountain.

Pippurusu
Most of these mouse-like creatures live in the La Roche Tower. Some of them exhibit yakuza-like personalities, and will begin a fight just by being spoken to.

Treeman
These plant-like creatures live in the Plain of Darkness. Some of them are acquaintances of Ms. Madeleine.

Brownie
This species claims to have created the universe. Their beards cause them to resemble dwarves, but Brownies are extremely lazy, and their souls will sometimes leave their bodies while they are asleep.

Pyrite
These creatures are directly modeled after the pyrite mineral. Their speech is displayed in hiragana.

Spirits
There are 16 different types of spirits (seirei), and up to 7 of one type can be recruited. These spirits can be summoned during battle to perform combos, and some spirits must be recruited in order to proceed through certain dungeons. In order to recruit spirits, the player must speak with each spirit symbol, and fulfill their demands. The requirements for recruiting new spirits become tougher to meet as the game progresses. Some spirits have special additional requirements, making it difficult to recruit all of the spirits available in the game.

One spirit of the element the player chooses for the main character at the beginning of the game will appear in the first half of the game. The requirement to recruit that spirit is one green Gummi Frog, regardless of the type of spirit. As a result, the seventh spirit of the player's original element will not appear. In the Remitz Palace, several spirits can be recruited by chasing Dodo towards the Love Ambassadors. No items are required to recruit the spirits in this scenario, but the room with the Dodo cannot be entered unless the player has at least one spirit of the kind depicted on the room's door.

Lux
The spirit of light appears in dungeons and inns, where the player must remain at the appearance points for about 40 seconds in order to recruit the spirit. Though no special item is required to recruit Lux, the spirit despises Nirva, the spirit of darkness, and Lux encountered later on in the game will refuse to join if a certain number of Nirva have already been recruited. The Lux in the secret dungeon only available to players bearing the light element will join only if no more than one Nirva has been recruited.

Nirva
The spirit of darkness must be recruited by beating them in battle. The spirit's symbol (a human skull) will not appear unless the player has caught a certain number of Gummi Frogs, and the minimum requirement for recruiting the Nirva in the deepest part of the secret dungeon of darkness is to catch over 1000 Gummi Frogs. The dungeon cannot be entered if the player possesses the light element.

Wish
The spirit of love has no item requirements to recruit, but catching over a certain number of Gummi Frogs causes them to disappear. This requirement becomes harder to meet for Wish encountered towards the end of the game, and the final one cannot be recruited if the player has bought a Gummi Frog at the store. 4 of these spirits join during specific events, and skipping the event or making a wrong choice during the event will cause the spirit to disappear forever. The spirit's symbol is a heart sign.

Toast
The only requirement for recruiting the spirit of fire is to pay them a certain number of Mirori silver coins. However, the spirit in Zundoko Hole will disappear if the player calls the other dwarves to continue digging. The spirit's symbol is a candle.

Humming
The spirit of sound is recruited by paying a certain number of Harmonic gold coins. Having a certain classmate on the team, along with the small ocarina item will lower the amount of coins demanded. The spirit's symbol is a musical note.

Air
The spirit of wind is recruited by paying a certain number of Rasimov gold coins. However, the final spirit must be recruited in a special way. The spirit's symbol is a feather.

Slash
The blade spirit is recruited by paying a certain number of Camti gold coins. The player must dispose of all Gummi Frogs before paying the spirit to join, but one character will retrieve all of the Gummis afterwards. The spirit's symbol is a sword.

Powder
The spirit of beauty is prideful, and will only join when paid a certain number of Ganick gold coins and if the player has below a certain number of Gummi Worms in their inventory. If the player catches more than a certain number of Gummi Worms while a beauty spirit is on the team will cause the spirit to demand that all of the worms be thrown away. Ignoring this demand will cause one beauty spirit to leave the team. The spirit's symbol is a mirror.

Flow
The spirit of water is difficult to find, and will join when paid a certain number of Crescent silver coins. Its symbol is a puddle.

Tesla
The spirit of thunder has a habit of saying the same word over and over again, and is recruited by paying a certain number of Helion gold coins. Its symbol is a light-bulb.

Garu
The beast spirit is recruited by giving them a certain number of Mahina tails. Its symbol is a footprint.

Boo
The spirit of poison is a bit mean-spirited, and is recruited by giving up a certain number of Shibina tails. Its symbol is a bottle.

Stick
The spirit of wood is recruited by giving up a certain number of pine cones. The wood spirits encountered later in the game will only join if a certain number of pine cones have been picked up. Its symbol is a tree branch.

Buzz
The bug spirit is recruited by giving up a certain number of yellow Gummi Worms, and can only be found using the magnifying glass item. Its symbol is a procession of small bugs.

Clock
The ancient spirit speaks like an elderly person, and is recruited by paying a certain number of Alti silver coins. One of the spirits has a special requirement to recruit. Its symbol is a gear.

Flint
The stone spirit is recruited by giving up a certain number of blue Gummi Frogs. However, the spirits will not appear unless the player has caught a certain number of Gummi Worms, not including worms caught with Chocolat or Kirche's special abilities.

Enigma
The Enigma are the mysterious creatures that ambushed the player at the summer school. They abduct the students of the Will-O-Wisp because they can increase their own power by merging with other creatures that have strong magical powers like the students. Enigma are resurrected unless they are killed in the Plain of Death, and all of them wield dark elemental magic. 1 in 5 graduates of the magic school are said to be afflicted by Enigma, and they plan to gradually take control of Kovomaka. Magic power itself was passed on to Gran Dragée by the Enigma, and encounters with them are inevitable for those who practice magic.

This type is the most numerous and lowest ranking of the Enigma. Most of their missions involve assaulting magicians to merge with. They are not very strong, and some of the classmates are able to fend them off on their own. They mostly function as generic enemies that are repeatedly killed off by the classmates and Miss Madeleine.

This type of Enigma is similar to Piskapook except for the horns growing on its body. Vulcaneira has transformation abilities, and lure the classmates into a trap by transforming into Arancia. Kirche and the real Arancia reveal its true identity, and it is killed by Ganache after attempting to merge with Kirche.

These Enigma resemble bugs, and tend to attack in groups. In their first appearance, three of them attack the main character at once, though the player only ends up fighting one of them. They merge with the dwarves afterwards, and two of them are defeated during the battle in the dwarf mountain. The final one is vanquished by Miss Madeleine after abducting Chocolat.

Rad hasnel is a variation of Dab Hasnel, which attempts to merge with Sesame in the Plain of Darkness. However, Sesame refuses to give in, and the Enigma is defeated by the classmates.

This Enigma assassinated the prior Enigma leader, Kerurendou, to become leader of the Enigma. He merges with Candy, whose mind was clouded with jealousy towards Olive and Ganache, and heads towards the Plain of Darkness with Ganache, but disintegrates after Olive convinces Candy to release her own magic.

The final boss of the game is the former leader of the Enigma, who was discredited after being defeated by Gran Dragée in a magic duel. He is assassinated by Equillikrew during the game, and resurrects himself at the Moginasu Lair of the Plain of Death. He then attempts to merge with Ganache, but his plan is foiled by the classmates. He controls 4 magic hands, which each possess a different element, and transforms into a balloon-like form before returning to his true devilish appearance.

Reception

On release, Famitsu magazine scored the game a 35 out of 40.

Notes

References

External links
Official
 Official website (Japanese) (Translated using Excite.Co.Jp)
 Official Nintendo Online Magazine website for Magical Vacation and Tomato Adventure (Japanese) (Translated using Excite.Co.Jp)
 Magical Vacation at GameFAQs
 Interview with the game's director

2001 video games
Brownie Brown games
Game Boy Advance games
Game Boy Advance-only games
Japan-exclusive video games
Nintendo games
Role-playing video games
Video games developed in Japan
Video games featuring protagonists of selectable gender
Video games scored by Tsukasa Masuko
Virtual Console games
Virtual Console games for Wii U
Works about vacationing